Jay Jianying Gan (born 1963) is an American agricultural  and environmental scientist. Gan is current chair of the Department of Environmental Sciences at University of California, Riverside.

Biography

Gan received his B.Sc. in agronomy in 1982,  M.Sc. in pesticides in 1985, and Ph.D. in pesticides in 1988, all from Zhejiang University in Hangzhou.

From 1990 to 1991, Gan was a research fellow of the International Atomic Energy Agency (IAEA) of United Nations at IAEA Laboratories. Gan was a research fellow of FAO/IAEA of the United Nations at USDA-ARS Veterinary and Entomology Toxicology Research Laboratory in Texas.

Gan joined the faculty of environmental sciences at University of California, Riverside and serves as professor of soil science, professor of environmental chemistry, and water quality specialist.

In 2006, Gan became a Fellow of the American Society of Agronomy.

Gan previously served as the department chair of Environmental Sciences.

References

1963 births
Living people
Zhejiang University alumni
University of California, Riverside faculty
Chinese emigrants to the United States
Environmental scientists
American earth scientists
American agronomists